Goran Radnić (born 4 May 1983 in Split) is a Croatian football player, currently a free agent after being released by RNK Split in December 2011.

References

External links
 

1983 births
Living people
Footballers from Split, Croatia
Association football defenders
Croatian footballers
Croatia youth international footballers
NK Novalja players
NK Uskok players
NK Solin players
HŠK Posušje players
FC Zimbru Chișinău players
RNK Split players
NK Neretva players
Croatian Football League players
Premier League of Bosnia and Herzegovina players
Moldovan Super Liga players
Croatian expatriate footballers
Expatriate footballers in Bosnia and Herzegovina
Croatian expatriate sportspeople in Bosnia and Herzegovina
Expatriate footballers in Moldova
Croatian expatriate sportspeople in Moldova